Samantha Henry-Robinson (born 25 September 1988) is a Jamaican sprinter. She won a silver medal in the 4x100 relay at the 2012 Summer Olympics in London, where she competed in the heats but not the final. Henry-Robinson was born in Kingston, Jamaica.

References

External links

1988 births
Living people
Sportspeople from Kingston, Jamaica
Jamaican female sprinters
Athletes (track and field) at the 2012 Summer Olympics
Olympic athletes of Jamaica
Olympic silver medalists for Jamaica
Medalists at the 2012 Summer Olympics
Athletes (track and field) at the 2014 Commonwealth Games
Olympic silver medalists in athletics (track and field)
Pan American Games medalists in athletics (track and field)
Pan American Games silver medalists for Jamaica
Athletes (track and field) at the 2015 Pan American Games
IAAF Continental Cup winners
Medalists at the 2015 Pan American Games
Commonwealth Games competitors for Jamaica
Olympic female sprinters
20th-century Jamaican women
21st-century Jamaican women